White Rock station is a DART Light Rail station in Dallas, Texas. It is located in East Dallas at East Northwest Highway (Loop 12) near West Lawther Drive. This was a short term northeastern terminus of the Blue Line until it was extended to LBJ/Skillman in May 2002.

References

External links 
 DART - White Rock Station

Dallas Area Rapid Transit light rail stations in Dallas
Railway stations in the United States opened in 2001
Railway stations in Dallas County, Texas